trans-4,5-Epoxy-(E)-2-decenal is an oxygenated α,β-unsaturated aldehyde found in mammalian blood that gives blood its characteristic metallic odor.  It is used by predators to locate blood or prey. Humans can smell it at a concentration of 1.5 pg/L in air, at 15 ng/L in water and 1.3μg/L in oil. It was permitted as a food flavouring in the EU until it was prohibited on 11 July 2017 on the grounds of possible genotoxicity, as observed from rat livers.

It can be formed during baking fats that contain linoleic acid. 13-Hydroperoxy-9,11-octadecadienoic acid and 9-hydroperoxy-10,12-octadecadienoic acid are intermediates in the process. The aldehyde also forms in cooked beef when it sits in the refrigerator for too long contributing to a stale smell. It is also an important part of the smell of raw and cooked mutton.

Humans are more sensitive to the smell of trans-4,5-Epoxy-(E)-2-decenal than mice.

References

Unsaturated compounds
Epoxides
Conjugated aldehydes